Crucero, California (Spanish for "Crossroads") is a ghost town in San Bernardino County, California.  It was located at the junction of the Union Pacific Railroad (originally the Los Angeles and Salt Lake Railroad) and the Tonopah and Tidewater Railroad.  Originally named Epsom, it was renamed in 1910 for the Spanish word for crossing. A post office existed at Crucero from 1911 to 1917 and from 1922 to 1943.   Following the abandonment of the T&T, the settlement was also abandoned.

References

Ghost towns in California
Populated places in the Mojave Desert
Former settlements in San Bernardino County, California
Tonopah and Tidewater Railroad
Unincorporated communities in California